Robert L. Doughton House is a historic home located at Laurel Springs, Alleghany County, North Carolina It was built in 1899, and is a two-story frame farmhouse in a vernacular Queen Anne style influenced frame cottage. It features a steeply pitched hip roof, with a two-story, one-bay gable roof projection. It was the home of Robert L. Doughton (1863-1954), one of North Carolina's foremost politicians of the first of the 20th century. In the 1990s Rufus A. Doughton's house was restored, and it is now a popular bed-and-breakfast for tourists to the region.

It was listed on the National Register of Historic Places in 1979.

References

External links
Doughton Hall Bed & Breakfast Inn

Bed and breakfasts in North Carolina
Houses on the National Register of Historic Places in North Carolina
Queen Anne architecture in North Carolina
Houses completed in 1899
Doughton family residences
Houses in Alleghany County, North Carolina
National Register of Historic Places in Alleghany County, North Carolina